Coeburn is a town in Wise County, Virginia, United States, along the Guest River. The population was 2,139 at the 2010 census.

History

The Town of Coeburn was originally named Guest Station after explorer and surveyor Christopher Gist. Gist writes about the area of Coeburn in his trip journals of making camp in the area with his son, Tom.

Incorporated in 1894, the Town changed its name from Guest Station to Coeburn after W. W. Coe, Chief Engineer of the N&W Railroad, and Judge W. E. Burns.

The Tacoma School was listed on the National Register of Historic Places in 1997.

Geography
Coeburn is located at  (36.943872, −82.466069).  The town lies along U.S. Route 58 Alternate east of Norton and west of St. Paul.  Virginia State Route 72 passes through the downtown area.  The community of Riverview is located across the Guest River to the south.

According to the United States Census Bureau, the town has a total area of 2.0 square miles (5.3 km2), all of it land.  Coeburn has many mountains and hills.

Demographics

As of the census of 2000, there were 1,996 people, 810 households, and 575 families living in the town. The population density was 973.8 people per square mile (375.9/km2). There were 923 housing units at an average density of 450.3 per square mile (173.8/km2). The racial makeup of the town was 95.29% White, 2.81% African American, 0.20% Native American, 0.10% Asian, 0.05% Pacific Islander, 0.05% from other races, and 1.50% from two or more races. Hispanic or Latino of any race were 0.60% of the population.

There were 810 households, out of which 29.6% had children under the age of 18 living with them, 50.2% were married couples living together, 16.3% had a female householder with no husband present, and 28.9% were non-families. 26.0% of all households were made up of individuals, and 11.6% had someone living alone who was 65 years of age or older. The average household size was 2.44 and the average family size was 2.92.

In the town, the population was spread out, with 22.5% under the age of 18, 9.4% from 18 to 24, 28.6% from 25 to 44, 23.9% from 45 to 64, and 15.6% who were 65 years of age or older. The median age was 39 years. For every 100 females, there were 93.4 males. For every 100 females age 18 and over, there were 90.5 males.

The median income for a household in the town was $25,025, and the median income for a family was $28,929. The per capita income for the town was $12,802. About 17.0% of families and 20.5% of the population were below the poverty line, including 29.9% of those under age 18 and 7.8% of those age 65 or over.

Education

Coeburn is home to three public schools: Coeburn Primary, Coeburn Middle, and Eastside High.

Government

The Town of Coeburn is governed under a Manager/Council form of government with 5 elected Council members elected at large in May.

Notable people
 Holly Kiser – first Make Me a Supermodel winner
 Jesse McReynolds – bluegrass musician
 Danny O'Quinn Jr. – professional stock car racer
 Tracy Stallard – professional baseball player
 Ralph Stanley – bluegrass musician

Recreation
Camping is available nearby at Bark Camp Lake in the Jefferson National Forest with other activities including boating and fishing.  The Guest River Gorge Trail, built along the Guest River on what was formerly the Interstate Railroad, is also located in the Jefferson National Forest and is a popular place to walk or ride a bicycle. Recently Coeburn joined with neighboring St. Paul on the Mountain View Trail System for ATVs.

References

External links

 Coeburn Official Website

Towns in Virginia
Towns in Wise County, Virginia